Ali Kayalı (born 29 January 1965) is a Turkish wrestler. He was born in Bulgaria. He was Olympic bronze medalist in Freestyle wrestling in 1992.

References

External links 
 

1965 births
Living people
Olympic wrestlers of Turkey
Wrestlers at the 1992 Summer Olympics
Turkish male sport wrestlers
Olympic bronze medalists for Turkey
Olympic medalists in wrestling
Medalists at the 1992 Summer Olympics
Mediterranean Games gold medalists for Turkey
Mediterranean Games medalists in wrestling
Competitors at the 1991 Mediterranean Games